Zekeria Ebrahimi (born 9 January 1996) is an Afghan actor. Ebrahimi is best known for his role in the 2007 film The Kite Runner as Young Amir. He has received extensive media coverage for playing this role, both because of his acting talent and because of the cultural misunderstandings that surrounded the making of the film, are thought to have endangered his life at home in Afghanistan.

References

External links
Official site of the film The Kite Runner
Dean Nelson, "Kabul kite boys feel Hollywood backlash", The Sunday Times, 14 January 2007. Accessed 8 January 2008.
David M. Halbfinger, "'Kite Runner' Boys Are Sent to United Arab Emirates", New York Times, 3 December 2007. Accessed 8 January 2008.
Herald Sun (Melbourne) 6 December 2007. Accessed 8 January 2008.
Jay Stone, "Child actors' performances keep The Kite Runner aloft", The Vancouver Sun, 21 December 2007. Accessed 8 January 2008.
The Evening Standard (London), December 27, 2007. Accessed 8 January 2008.

Living people
1996 births
21st-century Afghan male actors
Afghan male child actors
Afghan male film actors